Paschal-Womble House is a historic home located at Goldston, Chatham County, North Carolina. It was built in 1889, and is a two-story, three bay frame dwelling, with late-19th century additions.  It sits on a brick foundation, triple gable roof, and has a one-story flat-roofed front porch with sawnwork decoration.

It was listed on the National Register of Historic Places in 1984.

References

Houses on the National Register of Historic Places in North Carolina
Houses completed in 1889
Houses in Chatham County, North Carolina
National Register of Historic Places in Chatham County, North Carolina